This article contains information about the literary events and publications of 1611.

Events
January 1 – Oberon, the Faery Prince, a masque written by Ben Jonson and designed by Inigo Jones, is performed at Whitehall Palace.
February 3 – Love Freed from Ignorance and Folly, another Jonson/Jones masque, is also staged at Whitehall.
May 2 – The Authorized King James Version of the Bible appears, printed in London by Robert Barker.
May 11 – The first known performance of Shakespeare's The Winter's Tale, probably new this year, is given by the King's Men at the Globe Theatre in London.
November 1 – The King's Men give perhaps the first performance of The Tempest, Shakespeare's last solo play, at Whitehall Palace.
November 5 – The King's Men perform The Winter's Tale at Whitehall Palace.
December 26 – The King's Men return to Court with Beaumont and Fletcher's A King and No King.
December 27 – Queen Anne's Men act one of their most popular plays, Greene's Tu Quoque (The City Gallant; probably written by John Cooke) at Court, having previously performed it at the Red Bull Theatre.
unknown dates
The last known traditional performance of an English mystery play is given at Kendal.
Dramatist Juan Ruiz de Alarcón returns to Spain from Mexico.

New books

Prose
The Holy Bible, Authorized King James Version
Jacques Bongars – Gesta Dei per Francos
Thomas Coryat – Coryat's Crudities hastily gobbled up in Five Months Travels in France, Italy, &c
Randle Cotgrave – A Dictionarie of the French and English Tongues
John Donne – An Anatomy of the World
Giolla Brighde Ó hEoghusa (Bonaventura Ó hEoghusa or O'Hussey) – An Teagasc Criosdaidhe
Samuel Rowlands – The Knave of Clubs
John Speed:
The Historie of Great Britaine
The Theatre of the Empire of Great Britaine (map atlas)

Drama
Francis Beaumont and John Fletcher – A King and No King
George Chapman – May Day (published)
John Cooke (?) – Greene's Tu Quoque
Thomas Dekker and Thomas Middleton – The Roaring Girl (published)
Thomas Dekker – If This Be Not a Good Play, the Devil Is In It
Thomas Heywood – The Golden Age (published)
Ben Jonson
Oberon, the Faery Prince
Love Freed from Ignorance and Folly
Catiline His Conspiracy published
Johannes Messenius – Disa
Thomas Middleton (attributed to) – The Second Maiden's Tragedy
Anthony Munday – Chryso-Thriambos
William Shakespeare
The Winter's Tale (probable date)
The Tempest (consensus date)
Cyril Tourneur – The Atheist's Tragedy (published)

Poetry
See also 1611 in poetry
Richard Braithwaite – The Golden Fleece
John Donne – An Anatomy of the World
Emilia Lanier – Salve Deus Rex Judaeorum

Births
September 1 – William Cartwright, English dramatist (died 1643)
October 22 – Jacques Esprit ("abbé Esprit"), French moralist (died 1677)
October 26 – Antonio Coello, Spanish dramatist and poet (died 1652)
unknown dates
Richard Alleine, English religious writer (died 1681)
Charles Alphonse du Fresnoy, French writer on art and painter (died 1665)
Thomas Urquhart, Scottish translator (died c. 1660)
probable year
Jean François Sarrazin, French satirist (died 1654)

Deaths
February 8 – Jan Huyghen van Linschoten, Dutch historian (born 1563)
March 11 – Giles Fletcher, the Elder, English poet and diplomat (born c. 1548)
March 20 – Johann Georg Gödelmann, German demonological writer (born 1559)
April 23 – Martin Ruland the Younger, German alchemist and editor of his father's writings (born 1569)
June 8 – Jean Bertaut, French poet (born 1552)
September 22 – Pedro de Ribadeneira, Spanish ecclesiastical historian (born 1527)
unknown date
John Hamilton, Scottish Catholic controversialist (born c. 1547)

References

 
Years of the 17th century in literature